Coco Lee (born Ferren Lee, 17 January 1975) is a Chinese-American singer-songwriter, record producer, dancer, and actress. Lee's career began in Hong Kong and then expanded to Taiwan. Her single, "Do You Want My Love" also entered the US music charts. Her first full-length English-language album was Just No Other Way (1999) . At the Oscars, she performed the Best Original Song nominated, "A Love Before Time" from the movie Crouching Tiger, Hidden Dragon.

Early life
Lee was born in Hong Kong, she is the youngest of three children and was born to a Chinese Indonesian father and a Hongkong Cantonese mother. She has two elder sisters, Nancy, who was her manager before, and Carol. Her father died before she was born. When she was 9 years old, her mother brought Lee and her sisters to live in San Francisco. She attended Presidio Middle School and Raoul Wallenberg Traditional High School, both in San Francisco. The summer after graduating from high school, she was offered a recording contract in Hong Kong and attempted to juggle her burgeoning career there with her studies at the University of California, Irvine but eventually left after her freshman year to concentrate on her pop career.

Career

Career beginnings and Sony Music: 1992–1998
After Lee graduated from high school in 1992, she returned to Hong Kong to see her sisters participate in the Miss Hong Kong Pageant. While there, she took part in the 12th Annual New Talent Singing Awards and was the first runner-up, singing Whitney Houston's Run to you. The following day, Capital Artists offered her a recording contract. She made her debut by appearing in several compilation albums, such as Red Hot Hits '93 Autumn Edition (火熱動感93勁秋版). In 1994, working with Fancy Pie Records, she released her first solo albums in Mandarin, Love from Now On (愛就要趁現在) and Promise Me (答應我). In 1995, she released an English language cover album, Brave Enough to Love, as well as her third Mandarin album, Woman in Love (被愛的女人). In 1996, Lee signed a contract with Sony Music Entertainment and her subsequent album, "Coco Lee" became the best-selling album of 1996 in Asia. In 1997, she released the Mandarin album "Sincere" as well as a self-titled Cantonese album. In 1998, the Mandarin album Di Da Di was released and sold to 1 million copies in less than 3 months.

International collaborations and English debut: 1998–2005
From her next album Sunny day, "Colors of the World" was used for the opening of the Football World Cup, and the song The answer (答案) for the Chinese movie Bishonen. Walt Disney Pictures hired her to sing the theme song "Reflection" (自己) and be the voice of the heroine Fa Mulan in the Mandarin version of Mulan. In August 1998, Coco performed in Taiwan to a concert audience of more than 30,000 fans, the second largest concert audience in Taiwan (a feat that only Michael Jackson has claimed in the past).  She also performed in Michael Jackson's "Michael Jackson and friends" charity concert. In 1999, under 550 Music, Lee made her debut Just No Other Way which included the smashing hit, Do You Want My Love. Her love song Before I Fall In Love was included in the soundtrack of the movie Runaway Bride. She also had a duet called Can't get over with singer Kelly Price.  Lee recorded the charity singles "We meet the future" and "Hand in hand" for SARS with other artists including Wang Leehom, Stefanie Sun, Elva Hsiao, and Jolin Tsai. Back in Asia, she released a Mandarin album You & me. By 2000 she had released 20 albums in Asia and had sold 7.5 million copies of her albums in that continent. In 2001, Lee sang the song A Love Before Time for the movie Crouching Tiger, Hidden Dragon. Her album, Promise Coco released in October 2001. In 2002, Lee released her remix album D. Is Coco (Dance is Coco). She sang a song against tobacco called From the beginning til' the end (煙絲萬縷) with singer Jacky Cheung. She sang the anti racism song A dream of one with Korean singer Jin Young Park. In 2003, she performed with Shaggy at the "MTV Asia awards" in Singapore and also presented the show with him. Lee co-starred in the Chinese comedy movie Master of Everything (自娱自乐) with John Lone, which won the Best Foreign Film award in the 2005 Beverly Hills Film Festival. In 2004, as the Youth AIDS ambassador, she attended the global AIDS conference in Bangkok, Thailand as the representative of the Asian artists to meet various youth groups discussing what she can do to educate them about AIDS.

Second English album and Warner Music: 2005–2011

In 2005, Sony BMG released her second English album, Exposed. The album was banned in Mainland China for sexy lyrics in a few songs such as Touch or So good. Lee's next Mandarin album, Just Want You (要定你) was released on 22 September 2006. In 2008, Lee was chosen to sing one of the Olympic songs, "Forever Friends", opposite Sun Nan. She changed her record company to work with Warner Music Group (Taiwan) from Music Nation. On 14 August, she released her new Mandarin album East to west (CoCo的東西) with Warner Music Group. It contains the songs "Party time", "Turn" (流轉) which is the soundtrack of the movie "The Legend of Silkboy" (世博总动员-湖丝仔) for the Shanghai World Expo 2010 and "BYOB" ("Bring Your Own Bag") a song to encourage people to bring and recycle their own shopping bags to save the environment. She recorded the song "Smile Shanghai" (微笑上海) with other artists including JJ Lin, Andy Lau, Jam Hsiao or Jane Zhang for Shanghai World Expo 2010. On 27 March 2010, Lee began her "East2West" World Tour Concert in Taipei at Taipei Arena. She performed at the Encore Theatre in Wynn Casino in Las Vegas on 3 and 4 July, then in Singapore Indoor Stadium in Singapore on 2 October and in Nanning on 16 December. In March 2011, Lee was one of many artists participating in the recording of "Artists 311 Love Beyond Borders" (愛心無國界311燭光晚會) official theme song called Succumb not to sorrow (不要輸給心痛) in Cantonese version. On 7 April 2011, her song Dreams on oriental seas (梦在东方的海上) featuring Sun Nan was broadcast. It was named as the theme for the 14th FINA world championships, that took place in Shanghai on 16 July 2011.

New album: 2011–present
On 8 June 2011, Lee announced that she set up her own studio. On 25 June, her song Four seas alliance (四海盟約), the theme song for the 2011 China television drama All men are brothers (水滸傳), was broadcast. On 17 December 2011, she performed at "Booey Lehoo Concert" in Beijing with will.i.am and apl.de.ap from The Black Eyed Peas, John Legend and Shunza. On 9 February 2012, she performed at "I AM WILL / I AM ANGEL Benefit Concert" at Hollywood Palladium in Los Angeles with will.i.am, apl.de.ap and Taboo from The Black Eyed Peas.

Her new album Illuminate (盛開) was released on 31 May 2013 with Universal Music.

In 2016, she competed in the fourth season of the Chinese reality show I Am A Singer, although she admitted that losing her voice to bronchitis in 2014 had affected her singing ability. However, she recovered from it and participated, going on to win the competition, making her the first non-mainland Chinese singer to do so. Lee later returned as a guest singer for two more seasons (now rebranded with the new title Singer); on the fifth season during the biennial concert, and on the sixth season as with a guest performer for Jessie J, the eventual winner of that season.

Personal life
Lee married Bruce Rockowitz (born 1958), a Jewish-Canadian businessman and former CEO of Li & Fung on 27 October 2011 in a lavish Jewish wedding ceremony in Hong Kong. For her wedding, she registered the song "I just wanna marry u" (Chinese and English version), which was released on 24 October 2011. In 2016, she revealed that she has two adult step-daughters from her husband's previous marriage.

CoCo Lee is separated with soon-to-be-ex husband Bruce Rockowitz due to marriage turmoil and currently taking a sick leave from her feet surgery in early 2023.

Discography

Studio albums
{| class="wikitable" style="text-align:center;"
!align="left" width="300px"| Title
!align="left" width="200px"| Released Date
!align="left" width="150px"| Label
!align="left" width="100px"| Language
!align="left" width="350px"| Track Listing
|-
|Love from Now On (愛就要趁現在)
|15 June 1994
| rowspan="4"|Fancy Pie Records
| rowspan="2"|Mandarin
|
 I'm Still Your Lover (我依然是你的情人)
 Just Right Here (就到這裡)
 Can't Give You Tenderness (不能給你溫柔)
 Weekend in Taipei (週末的台北)
 Hard to Leave (難分難離) (feat. Cheung Shui-Chit 張瑞哲)
 Meant to Be (前世今生)
 Rose Garden (玫瑰園)
 Love from Now On (愛就要趁現在)
 Missing Your Love (想你的心想你的情)
 Tonight (今晚)

|-
|Promise Me (答應我)
|23 December 1994
|
 I'm Still Your Lover (Unplugged) (我依然是你的情人)
 Sincerely (真心真意)
 Promise Me (答應我)
 Love Will Never Return (愛,再也不回來)
 Don't Let Me Fall for You (別讓我真愛上你)
 Let Me Love (讓我愛吧)
 Cease to Be Faithful (變心)
 Love Come So Easy
 Fly (飛)
 You're Not My Only One (你不是我的唯一)
 Make the World More Beautiful (Merry Christmas) (讓世界更美麗)

|-
|Brave Enough to Love (勇敢去愛)
|12 June 1995
|English
|
 I've Never Been to Me (Charlene cover)
 Break Out (Swing Out Sister cover)
 Words Get in the Way (Miami Sound Machine cover)
 Smoke Gets in Your Eyes (Tamara Drasin cover)
 Love Me Tender (Elvis Presley cover)
 Stand by Me (Ben E. King cover)
 Hero (Mariah Carey cover)
 The Sign (Ace of Base cover)
 I Will Always Love You (Whitney Houston cover)
 Come Back to Me (Janet Jackson cover)

|-
| Woman in Love (被愛的女人)
|3 September 1995
| rowspan="2"|Mandarin
|
 You're the One I Love (我愛的是你)
 Woman in Love (Orchestre Version) (被愛的女人)
 You're in My Heart (你在我心上)
 Never Weary (不朽)
 Can't Learn to Love You More (學不會更愛你)
 Forget It (忘了吧)
 Unbiased (視若無睹)
 Woman in Love (被愛的女人)
 The Apple of Your Eyes (掌上明珠)
 Thanks (感謝)

|-
| CoCo Lee (CoCo李玟同名专辑)
|14 June 1996
| rowspan="7"|Sony Music Taiwan
|
 Love Me a Little Longer (愛我久一點)
 Yesterday's Passion (往日情)
 She Cries Before She Sleeps (feat. Mindy Ke/Quah柯以敏) (她在睡前哭泣)
 The Wonderful Thing About Love (愛情的好處)
 Asking My Heart (心裡問)
 Hiding from the Rain (無處躲雨)
 Trust (依賴)
 Need Some Lovin' Tonit
 Love You Forever (愛到底)
 The Last Chapter of the Fairy Tale (童話最後一章)

|-
| CoCo's Party
|25 November 1996
|English
|
 It's a Party
 Safe in the Arms of Love
 To Love You More (Celine Dion cover)
 This Masquerade (Leon Russell cover)
 There'll Be Sad Songs (Billy Ocean cover)
 Colors of the Wind (Judy Kuhn cover)
 I Love Your Smile (Shanice cover)
 Another Sad Love Song (Ballade Version) (Toni Braxton cover)
 Dancing Queen (ABBA cover)
 Shadow Dancing (Andy Gibb cover)
 Another Sad Love Song (Dance Version) (Toni Braxton cover)

|-
|Everytime I Think of You (每一次想你)
|14 May 1997
|Mandarin/Cantonese
|
 Love You Is My Freedom (愛你是我的自由)
 Everytime I Think of You (每一次想你)
 Garden of Eden (伊甸園)
 Cat (貓)
 On the Road (路上)
 Waiting for Love (等愛降落)
 In the Morning (明天一早的決定)
 My Wings (with sisters Carol & Nancy) (我的翅膀)
 Still in Love with You
 Love You Is Hard (愛你是大麻煩)
Special Edition:
  Waiting for Love (in Cantonese) (虚線)

|-
|Be Careful Next Time (CoCo Lee首張廣東專輯)
|10 November 1997
|Cantonese
|
 Longing to See You (真的想見你)
 Love You Again in 2090 (2090年再爱你)
 Be Careful Next Time (下次小心)
 Remain of Your Warmth (餘溫)
 Tight Between Men & Women (男女之爭)
 Never Forget (念念不忘)
 Mr. Almost-Right (差不多先生)
 Ask Yourself (问自己)
 Sad Angel (憂傷天使)
 If You Decided Not to Love Me (如果你決定不愛我)

|-
|Di Da Di Hints (DiDaDi暗示)
|13 January 1998
| rowspan="3"|Mandarin
|
 After Winter's Gone (過完冬季)
 Di Da Di
 All I Want to Say (暗示)
 Beautiful Bimbo Girl (美麗笨女人)
 Female Heart (女人心)
 Longing to See You (真想見到你)
 Perfect in Every Way
 Blame It on Pop Music (都是流行歌曲的錯)
 Message (訊息)
 Hint After Hint (再暗示)
 Someone Will Love Me (不怕沒人來愛我)
 Pet (寵物)

|-
|Sunny Day
| 30 June 1998
|
 You Are My Superman (你是我的Superman)
 Secretly Love You (默默愛你)
 Feelin' Good (好心情)
 Diamond (亮亮的承諾)
 Sunny Day (艷陽天)
 Reflection (自已)
 Don't Wanna Play (不玩這種)
 The Answer (答案)
 Don't Love You Anymore (不愛你了)
 Colors of the World (顏色)
 Hallucination (錯覺)
 Wu Wu La La La

|-
|From Today Until Forever (今天到永遠)
|27 May 1999
|
 See You Again (再見一面)
 Stay with Me
 From Today Until Forever (今天到永遠)
 Mirror (魔鏡)
 Handsome Man (美男子)
 Best Love (最好的愛)
 We Can Dance (我們可以跳舞)
 You Let Me Feeling (你讓我有感覺)
 You Do Love Me (你是愛我的)
 We Agreed (我們說好)
 Honesty Danger (真心話大冒險)
 Touch (觸摸)
 Complete (完整)

|-
|Just No Other Way
| 2 November 1999
|550 Music/Epic Records
|English
|
 Do You Want My Love (feat. A-Butter)
 Just No Other Way (To Love Me)
 Can't Get Over (feat. Kelly Price)
 Did You Really Love Me
 Before I Fall in Love
 Wherever You Go
 I Will Be Your Friend
 All Tied Up in You
 Don't You Want My Love
 Crazy Ridiculous
 Can We Talk About It

|-
|True Lover You & Me (真情人You & Me)
| 24 August 2000
| rowspan="2"|Sony Music Taiwan
|Mandarin
|
 True Lover (真情人)
 Love You Until... (愛你愛到)
 Another Woman's Perfume (誰的香水味) (feat. Silky Fine)
 Watch Out for Men (小心男人)
 Sweet Baby (撒野)
 You & Me
 My Happy Cannot Who (我的快樂不為誰)
 Natural Reaction (自然反應)
 When Love's in Pieces (當愛成碎片)
 You Asked... (你問)

|-
|Promise CoCo
|12 October 2001
|Mandarin/Cantonese
|
 So Crazy
 Female Warrior (actress versed in a swordplay) (刀馬旦) (feat. Jay Chou)
 Baby, I'm Sorry (Baby 對不起)
 Blue Sky (藍天)
 Love Too Much (愛太多)
 Let Go (逃脫)
 I'm Still in Love
 Eternal Promise (不變的諾言)
 Love So Real (愛是那麼真)
 Start the Countdown (倒數開始)
 Easy Come Easy Go (好來好往)
 Selfish Love (愛你才在意)
 A Love Before Time (月光愛人)

|-
|Exposed
|25 March 2005
|Sony BMG
|English
|
 Step In
 No Doubt (feat. Blaaze)
 Gotta Clue (feat. Joon Park of g.o.d)
 Hush
 So Good
 Touch
 Rock It
 All Around the World
 Belly Dance
 Cool (feat. Joon Park)
 Music We Make
 No Doubt (feat. Joon Park)
 Magic Words

|-
| Just Want You (要定你)
| 22 September 2006
|Sony Music Taiwan
| rowspan="2"|Mandarin
|
 Hip-Hop Tonight (feat. Vanness Wu)
 Just Want You (要定你)
 Love at 85 °C (愛在85°C)
 The Ninth Night (第九夜)
 Dangerous Lover (危險情人)
 Spy (諜對諜)
 Waiting for Me (等待為我)
 Deserted Island (無人島)
 Farvorly Loving Me (寵愛我)
 Never Ending Love (愛不停)

|-
| East to West (CoCo的東西)
| 14 August 2009
|Warner Music Taiwan/Music Nation Ursa Major Limited
|
 I Have a Dream
 I Love Movies (我愛看電影)
 BYOB (Bring Your Own Bag)
 Party Time
 Love Now (愛要現在)
 Beautiful Theme Song (美麗的主題曲)
 Turn (流轉)
 Ready or Not
 Shadow (影子)
 Triangle Heart (三角心)
 Already Loved (既然愛了)
 East to West (東西)
2010 Limited edition (2010 美夢限定版) :
  Sweet Dream (美夢)
 Hello-C
 Turn (Remix)

|-
| Illuminate (盛開)
| 31 May 2013
|Universal Music Taiwan/CL Production
|Mandarin/English
|
 Knock Knock (叩叩)
 Stuck on U (Stuck on U 偷心賊)
 Can't It Be (能不能)
 Side Effects of Love (愛的副作用)
 Party Queen
 Night Without You (想念你的夜)
 Illuminate (盛開)
 1 + 1 (一加一)
 Couples Dance (雙人舞)
 Match Made in Heaven
 I Just Wanna Marry You
2013 Limited edition (2013 閃亮限定版) :
  Knock Knock (Remix)
 I Just Wanna Marry You (Remix)

|-
|}

Live albums

Compilation albums

Remix albums

Extended plays

Maxi-singles

Digital singles

Compilation appearances

Videography

Filmography

Film

Television

Concert Tours

Tours

References

External links
 

1975 births
550 Music artists
Actresses from the San Francisco Bay Area
American dance musicians
American female dancers
Dancers from California
American contemporary R&B singers
American film actresses
American musicians of Chinese descent
American musicians of Indonesian descent
American musicians of Hong Kong descent
Record producers from California
American dancers of Asian descent
American mezzo-sopranos
American hip hop singers
American women hip hop musicians
Cantopop singers
21st-century American actresses
English-language singers from Hong Kong
Epic Records artists
Hong Kong emigrants to the United States
20th-century Hong Kong women singers
Hong Kong film actresses
Hong Kong hip hop musicians
Hong Kong Mandopop singers
Hong Kong record producers
Hong Kong songwriters
Hong Kong television actresses
Hong Kong mezzo-sopranos
Living people
Musicians from the San Francisco Bay Area
New Talent Singing Awards contestants
Sony BMG artists
University of California, Irvine alumni
Warner Music Group artists
Mezzo-sopranos
Songwriters from California
20th-century American women singers
20th-century American singers
21st-century American women singers
21st-century American singers
American soul singers
American women record producers